Nonka Decheva Matova (née Shatarova, Bulgarian: Нонка Матова Дечева; born 20 October 1954) is a Bulgarian police officer and rifle shooter who won silver at the 1992 Olympics and fourteen medals (including five gold) at World Championships. She is one of  the few Bulgarians to compete at six Olympic Games (1976–80, 1988–2000).

Matova was born in Plovdiv in 1954. At the 50m Rifle Three Positions World Championships, she  won individual silver in 1974 and bronze in 1998. She was part of the Bulgarian team that won silver in 1974, gold in 1986 and 1990, and bronze in 1998.

At the 50m Rifle Prone World Championships, she won individual bronze in 1974 and silver in 1986. She was also part of the Bulgarian team that won silver in 1986 and 1990, and was thus involved in all Bulgarian medals in the event in its first forty years (1996–2006) and counting.

At the 10m Air Rifle World Championships, she won individual bronze in 1989 and was part of the Bulgarian team that won gold in 1985, 1987, and 1989.

She has worked as a police officer for Bulgaria's Interior Ministry since 1979, and in 2003  was promoted to Major-General. She became a Member of the 39th National Assembly of Bulgaria from 2001 to 2005 for the constituency 17-PLOVDIV OKRAG.

General Matova also owns a Shooting Club.

See also
 List of athletes with the most appearances at Olympic Games

References

External links
 Profile

1954 births
Living people
Bulgarian female sport shooters
ISSF rifle shooters
Shooters at the 1992 Summer Olympics
Olympic shooters of Bulgaria
Olympic silver medalists for Bulgaria
21st-century Bulgarian women politicians
21st-century Bulgarian politicians
Members of the National Assembly (Bulgaria)
Shooters at the 1976 Summer Olympics
Shooters at the 1980 Summer Olympics
Shooters at the 1988 Summer Olympics
Shooters at the 1996 Summer Olympics
Shooters at the 2000 Summer Olympics
Bulgarian police officers
Olympic medalists in shooting
Bulgarian sportsperson-politicians
Medalists at the 1992 Summer Olympics